John Fumo (born 5 June 1957, Kenosha, Wisconsin) is an American composer, trumpet and flugelhorn,  artist. He maintains an active performing, recording, and touring schedule in addition to his CalArts and USC teaching. He has released 8 CDs to date. 

Fumo has played, recorded, and toured with a long and diverse list of major artists including Neil Diamond, Mel Tormé, Crosby Stills & Nash, Smokey Robinson, Tito Puente, Brian McKnight, Celine Dion, Neil Young, Tower of Power, Faith Hill, Al Jarreau, Whitney Houston, Flora Purim, k.d. lang, Brian Setzer, Johnny Mathis, James Brown, Charlie Haden, Ricky Martin, Phoebe Snow, Vinny Golia, Jeff Kaiser, Lou Rawls, John Tesh, Bon Jovi, Avenged Sevenfold and many others.

Fumo has written source music cues for TV and Film including Mad Men, Aquarius, Suits, and 50/50. He has also performed on dozens of film scores, and his TV appearances include The David Letterman Show and The Tonight Show.

References

External links 
 https://johnfumo.bandcamp.com/dashboard

1957 births
Living people
Musicians from Kenosha, Wisconsin
Flugelhorn players
American trumpeters
American male trumpeters
21st-century trumpeters
21st-century American male musicians